Carol C. Johnson (born January 28, 1941) is a politician in the Minnesota Democratic-Farmer-Labor Party. She was the last person and the only woman to serve as Minnesota State Treasurer before the office was abolished in 2003. Before she assumed the office in 1999, she served as an assistant to the previous treasurer, Michael A. McGrath. She had also served in a number of local government positions in Bloomington, Minnesota.

References

1941 births
Living people
Minnesota Democrats
State treasurers of Minnesota